This is a list of individuals known for extensive body modification.

A 

Nina Arsenault, (born 1974) Canadian performance artist

B 
Martina Big
Pete Burns, (1959–2016) had extensive polyacrylamide injections into his lips, along with cheek implants, several nose re-shapings and many tattoos

D 

Elaine Davidson, Brazilian the "Most Pierced Woman" according to the Guinness World Records.
Lucky Diamond Rich, holds the Guinness world record as "the world's most tattooed person" as of 2006

E 

The Enigma

F 
Farrah Flawless
Lolo Ferrari

G 

Rick Genest "Rico" (The Zombie Boy/Rico the Zombie), Canadian artist and fashion model featured on Lady Gaga's album Born This Way. Had his entire head and torso tattooed so as to appear like a decaying cadaver.
Julia Gnuse ("The Illustrated Lady")
Matt Gone

H 

Neil Harbisson has an antenna implanted in his skull and a compass implanted inside his knee.
Steve Haworth
 Victor Hugo Peralta and his wife Gabriela were, as of November 2012, the most modified married couple.

J 

Cindy Jackson, (born 1956) had more cosmetic surgery procedures than anyone else in the world
Maria Jose Cristerna
 Cathie Jung,(born 1937)  has the smallest waist in the world as a result of corsetry

K 

Katzen ("Tiger lady")

L 

Tom Leppard, (born Tom Wooldridge 1935–2016) formerly considered by the Guinness Book of World Records to be the world's most tattooed man.
Hao Lulu, (born 1979) extensive cosmetic surgery in 2003 to alter her appearance, tagged "The Artificial Beauty"

M 

Heidi Montag, (born 1986), TV personality,  had ten plastic surgeries in one day
Fakir Musafar, The father of the modern primitive movement, having exposed himself to body piercing, tightlacing, scarification, tattooing and suspension

O 

Orlan, (born 1947) French performance artist

R 

Horace Ridler ("The Great Omi"), (1882–1965) tattooed in a pattern of curved black stripes, often described as zebra-like.
Roland (Japanese host), whose extensive plastic surgeries have cost over 10 million yen, with 200,000 per month in upkeep costs.

S 
Shawn O'Hare (Body Modification artist)
Erik Sprague, "The Lizardman", (born 1972) with sharpened teeth, full-body tattoo of green scales, bifurcated tongue and green-inked lips
The Scary Guy, his nose, eyebrows and ears are pierced and tattoos cover 85 percent of his body.
Stalking Cat ("Cat man") born Dennis Avner; 1958–2012) 
Stelarc, (born; Stella Arcadiou, 1946) got a cell-cultivated ear implanted into his left arm

T 
Sahar Tabar, (born Fatemeh Khishvand; 2001) Iranian artist, used makeup and photoshop to post distorted images of herself. In December 2020, she was sentenced to ten years in prison for these activities.

W 

Kevin Warwick, (born 1954) a British scientist, in 1998 became the first human to experiment with an RFID implant. He followed that up in 2002 by having a 100 electrode array implanted in his nervous system.
Jocelyn Wildenstein ("Lion Queen/Cat Woman") (born 1940), Swiss socialite

Body modification hoax:
 Jasmine Tridevil (real name Alisha Jasmine Hessler), implanting of a third breast

References

Body modification

Modifications of body